Mary Harvey (born 1965) is an American soccer goalkeeper.

Mary Harvey may also refer to:
Lady Mary Dering (née Harvey, 1629–1704), English composer

See also
Mary Hervey, maid of honour
Mary-Sophie Harvey, Canadian swimmer